Ketchikan Creek (alternate, "Fish Creek"; Tlingit, "Kitschkhin") is a salmon spawning stream on Revillagigedo Island in the U.S. state of Alaska. It heads in a lake and travels through downtown Ketchikan
 to Tongass Narrows. The historic Creek Street in Ketchikan runs along the creek banks as a piling-perched boardwalk.

References

Ketchikan, Alaska
Rivers of Alaska
Rivers of Ketchikan Gateway Borough, Alaska